Wołowiec may refer to the following places:
 Wołowiec, Lesser Poland Voivodeship (south Poland)
 Wołowiec, Goleniów County in West Pomeranian Voivodeship (north-west Poland)
 Wołowiec, Kamień County in West Pomeranian Voivodeship (north-west Poland)
 Wołowiec, a mountain in Western Tatra Mountains

See also